Spawn (Again): A Tribute to Silverchair is a compilation album by various artists, released by UNFD on 17 November 2017. The album is composed of cover songs as a tribute to the Australian rock band, Silverchair.

A limited edition LP was released with only 1,000 copies pressed.

Background and promotion
The album was created with blessing of Silverchair's team to celebrate the twentieth anniversary of their album Freak Show. All the artists featured on the album are Australian bands signed onto UNFD.

Former frontman and songwriter of Silverchair, Daniel Johns gave his support for the album saying:
"At first I didn’t know what to think of this album concept, I guess it never really dawned on me that a Silverchair tribute album would ever be a thing, it’s funny though, sitting down and listening to the tracks I felt a strange reconnection with these songs, most of them I wrote when I was a teenager. I appreciate the time these bands have taken to record these new versions of the tunes."

The lead single "Anthem for the Year 2000" performed by Northlane, was released on 11 October 2017. The second single, "Ana's Song (Open Fire)" performed by Hands Like Houses, was released on 26 October. The third single, "Without You" performed by Tonight Alive, was released on 8 November. The fourth single, "Tomorrow" performed by The Amity Affliction, was released on 13 November.

A music video for the In Hearts Wake rendition of "Freak" was released on 4 December.

Composition
Due to the myriad of different bands present on the album most songs have had their genre described separately. The cover of "Freak" by In Hearts Wake was criticised for sounding like a "forgettable metalcore number." "Anthem for the Year 2000" by Northlane was reviewed as embracing their usual progressive metal sound. Hands Like Houses' rendition of "Ana's Song (Open Fire)" was described as being post-hardcore. The genre of the title track by Ocean Grove is described as nu-metal. Tonight Alive vocalist Jenna McDougall's deliverance of "Without You" was reviewed as: "[giving] [sic] the track a familiar, uplifting pop-rock shine." "Straight Lines" by Columbus was said to be a "pop-punk banger".

Critical reception

The album received mixed reviews. Alex Sievers from KillYourStereo criticised it harshly saying: "overall, ‘Spawn (Again)…’ is still not that great. For just like how a couple great songs don’t make an album instantly great, a couple great covers doesn’t automatically make a whole covers album great." Wall of Sound in a more positive review said: "I reckon [Silverchair] will be stoked to hear new age renditions of their classics, but in the same breath, there’s maybe two or three versions that didn’t need to make the final cut." Brian Giffin from Loud noted the only highlights of the album being the covers of "Spawn", "Israel's Son", "Cemetery", "Anthem for the Year 2000", and "Straight Lines", calling everything else "either terrible (Tonight Alive, In Hearts Wake) or barely good." In a negative review, the Newcastle Herald called "Some of the worst offenders [sic] the big-name acts. Amity Affliction’s Tomorrow is horrendously auto-tuned and In Hearts Wake’s cover of Freak is a whiny industrial rock mess." Sêan Reid of Already Heard in a mixed review said: "While there are a handful of highlights, ‘Spawn Again’ is no different than most tribute records." Daniel Källmalm from Hallowed drew praise to Northlane's cover of "Anthem for the Year 2000" calling it: "the most memorable track of the whole thing."

In a mixed review by Luke Nuttall  from The Soundboard said: "The fact that there’s quality from The Amity Affliction and In Hearts Wake here is a borderline miracle, and for a compilation that will undoubtedly prove to be something of a novelty in the future, there’s enough to get into here without being disappointed." Mandy Stefanakis from Loud Mouth in a positive review said: "It works very nicely and with a little luck will unite some listeners who found themselves a little muddled during their Silverchair journey."

Track listing

Personnel

Bands

The Amity Affliction
 Ahren Stringer – clean and additional unclean vocals, keyboards, bass
 Joel Birch – unclean vocals, additional clean vocals
 Dan Brown – rhythm guitar, lead guitar, backing vocals
 Ryan Burt – drums, percussion

Void of Vision
 Jack Bergin – lead vocals
 James McKendrick – lead guitar, clean vocals
 Mitch Fairlie – rhythm guitar
 Matt Thompson – bass, backup vocals
 George Murphy – drums

In Hearts Wake
 Jake Taylor – lead vocals
 Eaven Dall – lead guitar, backing vocals
 Ben Nairne – rhythm guitar
 Kyle Erich – bass, clean vocals
 Conor Ward – drums

The Brave
 Nathan Toussaint – lead vocals
 Kurt Thomson – lead guitar
 Dave Mead – rhythm guitar
 Daniel Neucom – bass
 Brent Thomson – drums

Northlane
 Marcus Bridge – lead vocals
 Jon Deiley – lead guitar
 Josh Smith – rhythm guitar
 Alex Milovic – bass
 Nic Pettersen – drums, percussion

Hands Like Houses
 Trenton Woodley – lead vocals
 Matt Cooper – lead guitar
 Alexander Pearson – rhythm guitar, backing vocals
 Joel Tyrrell – bass, backing vocals
 Matt Parkitny – drums

Ocean Grove
 Luke Holmes – lead vocals
 Dale Tanner – vocals, bass
 Jimmy Hall – guitar
 Matthew Henley – guitar
 Sam Bassal – drums, production
 Running Touch – samples, keyboards, additional vocals

Storm the Sky
 William Jarratt – lead vocals
 Andy Szetho – lead guitar
 Lachlan Avis – rhythm guitar, keyboards
 Benny Craib – bass
 Alex Trail – drums

Tonight Alive
 Jenna McDougall – lead vocals
 Jake Hardy – rhythm guitar, lead guitar
 Cameron "Cam" Adler – bass, backing vocals
 Matt Best – drums, percussion

Columbus
 Alex Moses – vocals
 Ben Paynter – guitar
 Daniel Seymour – drums

Production
 Will Putney – producer, mixing, and mastering (track 1)
 Sam Bassal – producer, mixing, programming, mastering (track 2, 7)
 Josh Schroeder – producer, mixing, and mastering (track 3)
 Troy Brady – producer, engineering (track 4)
 David Bendeth – producer, engineering (track 5)
 Erik Ron – producer (track 6)
 Samuel K – producer (track 8)
 Dave Petrovic – producer (track 9)
 Jay Maas – producer (track 10)
 GZ Media – LP pressing

References

2017 compilation albums
Covers albums
UNFD albums
Silverchair
Tribute albums